Hussein Abdelbagi Akol Agany is one of the vice presidents of South Sudan. Abdelbagi is a Malual Dinka from Northern Bahr el Ghazal. Abdelbagi, born in the late 1960s, was a son of the politically influential Malual Dinka tribal leader Sultan Abdelbagi Akol (1928-2020), who was among other things considered the spiritual head of the South Sudanese Muslims. Gen. Abdelbagi was the Chief of General Staff of the South Sudan Patriotic Army, which became part of the South Sudan Opposition Alliance. On August 25, 2018, the SSPM/A split, with Abdelbagi creating a faction that claimed to have removed Costello Garang Ring for rejecting the peace process and attacking communities on the border with Sudan. On July 23, 2019, the SSPM/A faction of Costello Garang Ring claimed to remove Abdelbagi from office. He became the speaker of the South Sudan Opposition Alliance faction led by Gabriel Changson Chang after it split in November 2018. As part of the unity government deal the SSOA was allowed to pick one out of the five vice presidents. The SSOA failed to decide on a vice president, so they authorized president Salva Kiir to pick from a list of six leaders. On February 23, 2020, Kiir picked Abdelbagi, making him the fifth vice president. Abdelbagi is the first Muslim Vice President of South Sudan and the highest ranking Muslim to be a part of any government in South Sudan.

References 

Living people
Vice-presidents of South Sudan
Year of birth missing (living people)
South Sudanese Muslims
People from Bahr el Ghazal
People from Northern Bahr el Ghazal
Dinka people
21st-century South Sudanese politicians